Let It Beat is the second studio album by American rapper Shwayze. It was first announced by Cisco Adler on February 4, 2009, via his Myspace page. He also confirmed the song "Make A Lil Love" in that blog post. A few days later he posted another blog update, which confirmed the track "Livin' It Up," It also confirmed guest appearances from  The Knux, and Tabi Bonney. On May 8, 2009 Cisco announced that the album is entitled Let It Beat, and was currently being mixed and mastered. Although Shwayze's previous debut album only had one guest appearance, this album has guest appearances from The Knux, Tabi Bonney, and Snoop Dogg. Darryl Jenifer of Bad Brains plays bass on a track called "Crazy For You," and Ric Ocasek of The Cars plays guitar on the same track. Roy Bittan the pianist of  Bruce Springsteen & The E Street Band plays piano on the track Heart and Soul. The first single, "Get U Home" was released on June 28.

Track listing

Personnel

Shwayze
Cisco Adler - lead vocals, Guitar, Piano
Shwayze - lead vocals

Additional musicians
Mark Smidt - Trumpet, Trombone, Baritone Sax, Acoustic Guitar, Organ, Bass guitar, Keyboards, Electric Guitar, Trumpets Horn Arrangement,
Ric Ocasek - Guitar, Synthesizer, Backing Vocals
Darryl Jenifer - Bass guitar
Kool Kojak - Drum Programming, Synths, Bass guitar. Backing Vocals
Roy Bittan - Piano
Snoop Dogg - Vocals
The Knux -
Tabi Bonney - Vocals

Chart positions

References 

2009 albums
Shwayze albums